Gerrit Patist (1947 – 2005, in De Bilt) was a Dutch sculptor and ceramist. Patist had produced many works of art, mostly sculptures and ceramics, but he had worked with brush and ink. He died at age 68 from leukemia.

See also  
 List of Dutch ceramists

References 

1947 births
2005 deaths
Dutch ceramists
People from Leiderdorp
20th-century ceramists